What It Means to Be Defeated is the debut album by American post-hardcore band Dayseeker which was released on October 29, 2013.

Production history
On July 8, 2013, it was announced that Dayseeker signed a recording contract with InVogue Records. The same day the band released a lyric video from "Hollow Shell" as well as a live music video from "Collision.Survive", which are both featured on the album. The album was mastered by Joey Sturgis who had worked with bands like Emmure, Asking Alexandria and The Devil Wears Prada.

On October 6, 2013, the band released an acoustic video for the same-named song, "What It Means to Be Defeated". The band streamed their entire album three days prior to its release on October 26, 2013, via Alternative Press page. On October 26, 2014, it was announced that the album would be re-issued on November 24, 2014. It was re-mastered by Tom Denney and featured four acoustic bonus tracks.

Promotion and success
In promotion of the album, Dayseeker had a three-week concert tour through the United States with metalcore band Kingdom Of Giants in November and December 2013. In April and May the band toured the Artery Across The Nations Tour alongside Upon This Dawning and The Browning. In March and April 2015 the band is part of a concert tour with Courage My Love and Hawthorne Heights.

On December 3, 2014, it was announced that the re-issue of What It Means to Be Defeated had sold only 410 copies after its re-release on November 24, 2014.

Track listing

Personnel

Dayseeker
 Rory Rodriguez – vocals
 Alex Polk – guitar
 Andrew Sharp – bass
 Gino Scambelluri – guitar
 Mike Karle – drums

Additional personnel
 Jeff Darcy – producer, mixing
 Tom Denney - re-mastering
 Joey Sturgis - mastering
 Chris Moore - art design
 Nathan Mead - guest vocals on track 4
 Garrett Russell – guest vocals on track 9

References

2013 debut albums
Dayseeker albums
InVogue Records albums